Michael Christie (born 23 January 1987 in Glasgow) is a male field hockey defender from Scotland, who earned his first cap for the Men's National Team in 2005. He plays club hockey for Kelburne HC. His older brother Jonathan is also a member of men's national squad.  He was a member of the squad that competed at the 2006 Commonwealth Games in Melbourne, Australia, but missed the Delhi games in 2010 Commonwealth Games due to injury.

References

1987 births
Living people
Scottish male field hockey players
Field hockey players at the 2006 Commonwealth Games
Field hockey players from Glasgow
Commonwealth Games competitors for Scotland